Blue Top Ridge Golf Course is a golf course in Riverside, Iowa.  The course is part of the Riverside Casino and Resort.  It was designed by golf course architect Rees Jones and completed in 2007.

Blue Top Ridge is an 18-hole facility with par 72 spanning over 7400 yards.

References

External links 
 bluetopridge.com
 riversidecasinoandresort.com

Golf clubs and courses in Iowa
2009 establishments in Iowa